York Country Day School is a progressive Preschool through Grade 12 independent school located in York, Pennsylvania. It is an affiliate of York College of Pennsylvania.

Headmasters of York Country Day School 
 Kenneth Snyder (1953–1969)
 John Colbaugh (1969–1973)
 Timothy Bray (1973–1975)
 David L. Seavey (1975–1977)
 John Polhemus (1978–1983)
 Brian P. O'Neil (1983–1985)
 Gilbert Smith (1985–1988)
 Taylor A. Smith (1988–2000)
 Dean Cheesebrough (2000–2001)
 Daniel J. Rocha (2001–2004)
 Robert Shanner (2004–2007)
 Nathaniel Coffman (2007–2014)
 Christine Heine (2014–present)

External links
York Country Day School
York College of PA
NAIS

Private elementary schools in Pennsylvania
Private middle schools in Pennsylvania
Private high schools in Pennsylvania
1787 establishments in Pennsylvania
Schools in York County, Pennsylvania
Buildings and structures in York, Pennsylvania